"Doesn't Matter (Voleur de soleil)", also released under the title "Doesn't Matter", is a song by French singer Christine and the Queens. "Doesn't matter (voleur de soleil)" is sung largely in French (with the exception of the chorus), whilst "Doesn't Matter" is a fully English version. Both versions were released on 5 July 2018.

Background
The singer announced his second album, Chris, for release later in 2018 and a new tour for the northern hemisphere autumn. Seven weeks after he released the first single, "Damn, dis-moi / Girlfriend", he released the second single on 5 July 2018.

Music videos
The videos of the two versions were released on Christine and the Queen's YouTube channel on 5 July 2018.

Personnel
 Héloïse Adelaïde Letissier – drum programming, Neuron, additional synthesisers
 Cole M.G.N. – drum programming, additional synthesisers
 David Frank – bass

Charts

Release history

References

2018 singles
2018 songs
Christine and the Queens songs
Songs written by Héloïse Letissier